The 2009 Men's EuroHockey Nations Championship was the 12th edition of the EuroHockey Nations Championship, the biennial international men's field hockey championship of Europe organized by the European Hockey Federation. It was held in Amsterdam, Netherlands from 22 to 30 August 2009.

England won the tournament for the first time after defeating Germany 5–3 in the final. The hosts and defending champions the Netherlands secured third place after defeating Spain 6–1 in the third-place playoff.

Qualified teams

Results
All times are local, CEST (UTC+2).

Preliminary round

Pool A

Pool B

Fifth to eighth place classification
The points obtained in the preliminary round against the other team are taken over.

Pool C

First to fourth place classification

Semi-finals

Third and fourth place

Final

Final standings

 Qualified for the 2010 World Cup

 Relegated to the EuroHockey Championship II

See also
2009 Men's EuroHockey Nations Trophy
2009 Women's EuroHockey Nations Championship

References

 
Men's EuroHockey Nations Championship
Men 1
EuroHockey Nations Championship
International field hockey competitions hosted by the Netherlands
EuroHockey Nations Championship
Sports competitions in Amstelveen
EuroHockey Nations Championship